= Annales d'histochimie =

- Discipline: Histochemistry
- Language: English

Publication details
- History: 1956–1976
- Publisher: Gauthier Villars Editeur
- Frequency: Quarterly

Standard abbreviations
- ISO 4: Ann. Histochim.

Indexing
- CODEN: ANHIAG
- ISSN: 0003-4355
- OCLC no.: 01481309

Annales d'histochimie was a peer-reviewed scientific journal established in 1956, and published by the French society of histochemistry. The journal covered the field of histochemistry, and was published quarterly over 21 volumes, until 1976.
